Docaviv, subtitled "the Tel Aviv International Documentary Film Festival" is the only film festival in Israel dedicated to documentary films, and the largest film festival in Tel Aviv.

It is run by a non-profit organisation of the same name, founded in 1998. In recent years (to 2021) the festival has drawn an attendance of around 40,000.

Docaviv Galilee is a five-day offshoot of the festival, held at Ma’alot Tarshiha.

References

External links

Documentary film festivals in Israel
Festivals in Tel Aviv
Organizations established in 1998